Jazztel is a Spanish telecommunications company which offers triple play services (telephone, Internet and television). In 2018, Jazztel was made to pay fines for their telemarketing tactics.

About

Jazztel was founded in 1998 by Martin Varsavsky. Jazztel is a Spanish company, owned by a British company called Jazztel p.l.c.  It was incorporated under the laws of England and Wales in July 1998. Jazztel p.l.c. is listed on the Spanish Nuevo Mercado since December 18, 2000. 

In September 2014, it was agreed that Orange España would acquire Jazztel for a fee of €3.4 billion.

References

External links
Official website

Telecommunications companies established in 1998
Companies based in the London Borough of Camden
Companies listed on the Madrid Stock Exchange
Telecommunications companies of Spain
Orange S.A.